John Atlee may refer to:

John Atlee (athlete) (1882–1958), American athlete
John Light Atlee (1799–1885), American physician
Samuel John Atlee (1739–1786), American soldier and statesman
John Yorke AtLee (1853–1933), recording artist in the 1890s in the United States

See also
John Attlee, 3rd Earl Attlee (born 1956), British peer